This is a list of diplomatic missions of Venezuela, excluding honorary consulates. Venezuela has an extensive global diplomatic presence and is the Latin American country with the third highest number of diplomatic missions after Brazil and Cuba.

Africa 

 Algiers (Embassy)

 Luanda (Embassy)

 Cotonou (Embassy)

 Brazzaville (Embassy)

 Cairo (Embassy)

 Malabo (Embassy)

 Addis Ababa (Embassy)

 Nairobi (Embassy)

Bamako (Embassy)

 Rabat (Embassy)

 Maputo (Embassy) 

 Windhoek (Embassy)

 Abuja (Embassy)

 Dakar (Embassy)

 Pretoria (Embassy)

 Khartoum (Embassy)

 Tunis (Embassy)

Americas 

 Saint John's (Embassy)

 Buenos Aires (Embassy)

 Bridgetown (Embassy)

 Belmopan (Embassy)

 La Paz (Embassy)

 Brasília (Embassy)
 Belém (Consulate-General)
 Boa Vista (Consulate-General)
 Manaus (Consulate-General)
 Rio de Janeiro (Consulate-General)
 São Paulo (Consulate-General)

 Ottawa (Embassy)

 Santiago (Embassy)

 Bogotá (Embassy)
 Arauca (Consulate-General)
 Barranquilla (Consulate-General)
 Bucaramanga (Consulate-General)
 Cartagena (Consulate-General)
 Cúcuta (Consulate-General)
 Medellín (Consulate-General)
 Puerto Carreño (Consulate-General)
 Riohacha (Consulate-General)

 San José (Embassy)

 Havana (Embassy)

 Roseau (Embassy)

 Santo Domingo (Embassy)

 Quito (Embassy)
 Guayaquil (Consulate-General)

 San Salvador (Embassy)

 St. George's (Embassy)

 Guatemala City (Embassy)

 Georgetown (Embassy)

 Port-au-Prince (Embassy)

 Tegucigalpa (Embassy)

 Kingston (Embassy)

 Mexico City (Embassy)

 Managua (Embassy)

 Panama City (Embassy)

 Lima (Embassy)

 Basseterre (Embassy)

 Castries (Embassy)

 Kingstown (Embassy)

 Paramaribo (Embassy)

 Port of Spain (Embassy)

 Washington, D.C. (Embassy)
 Boston (Consulate-General)
 Chicago (Consulate-General)
 Houston (Consulate-General)
 Miami (Consulate-General)
 New Orleans (Consulate-General)
 New York City (Consulate-General)
 San Francisco (Consulate-General)
 San Juan (Consulate-General)

 Montevideo (Embassy)

Asia 

 Baku (Embassy)

 Beijing (Embassy)
 Hong Kong (Consulate-General)
 Shanghai (Consulate-General)

 New Delhi (Embassy)

 Jakarta (Embassy)

 Tehran (Embassy)

 Baghdad (Embassy)

 Tel Aviv (Embassy)

 Tokyo (Embassy)

 Amman (Embassy)

 Astana (Embassy)

 Kuwait City (Embassy)

 Beirut (Embassy)

 Kuala Lumpur (Embassy)

 Pyongyang (Embassy)

 Ramallah (Representative Office)

 Manila (Embassy)

 Doha (Embassy)

 Riyadh (Embassy)

 Singapore (Embassy)

 Seoul (Embassy)

 Damascus (Embassy)

 Ankara (Embassy)
 Istanbul (Consulate-General)
 
 Abu Dhabi (Embassy)

 Hanoi (Embassy)

Europe 

 Vienna (Embassy)

 Minsk (Embassy)

 Brussels (Embassy)

 Paris (Embassy)

 Berlin (Embassy)
 Frankfurt (Consulate-General)

 Athens (Embassy)

 Rome (Embassy)

 Budapest (Embassy)

 Rome (Embassy)
 Milan (Consulate-General)
 Naples (Consulate-General)

 The Hague (Embassy)
 Oranjestad, Aruba (Consulate-General)
 Willemstad, Curaçao (Consulate-General)

 Oslo (Embassy)

 Warsaw (Embassy)

 Lisbon (Embassy)
 Funchal (Consulate-General)

 Bucharest (Embassy)

 Moscow (Embassy)

 Belgrade (Embassy)

 Madrid (Embassy)
 Barcelona (Consulate-General)
 Bilbao (Consulate-General)
 Santa Cruz de Tenerife (Consulate-General)
 Vigo (Consulate-General)

 Bern (Embassy)

 London (Embassy)

Oceania 

 Canberra (Embassy)

Multilateral organizations 
 Addis Ababa (Permanent Observer to the African Union)
 Brussels (Mission to the European Union)
 Geneva (Permanent Mission to the United Nations and other International Organizations)
 Montevideo (Permanent Missions to ALADI and MERCOSUR)
 Nairobi (Permanent Missions to the United Nations and other International Organizations)
 New York (Permanent Mission to the United Nations)
 Paris (Permanent Mission to UNESCO)
 Rome (Permanent Mission to FAO)
 Washington, D.C. (Permanent Mission to the Organization of American States)

Gallery

Closed missions

Africa

Americas

Europe

See also 
 Foreign relations of Venezuela
 List of diplomatic missions in Venezuela

Notes

References

 
Venezuela
Diplomatic missions